is a Japanese voice actress from Tokyo. She is affiliated with Aptepro.

Works

Anime
Nisekoi (2014) - Raku Ichijou (child), Female Student, Schoolgirl, Student, Suzuki
Aikatsu! (2014–16) - Miyabi Fujiwara
[[Dog Days (Japanese TV series)|Dog Days]] (2015) - Maid, Newscaster, Star's PeopleYoung Black Jack (2015) - ChuAnti-Magic Academy: The 35th Test Platoon (2015), Akira Yoshimizu, Hostess B, NeroTanaka-kun is Always Listless (2016) - Miyo-chan. Boy B, Furuya-sensei, SchoolgirlMagic of Stella (2016) - Haruma Seki, Seller, Student, Yumine's motherHaikyu!! 3rd Season (2016) - Schoolgirl, Shiratorizawa female supporter, Tendō's coach Sagrada Reset (2017) - Advisor, Hiroyuki Sasano (child)Princess Principal (2017) - PrincessNew Game!! (2017) - Butterfly PinkHow to Keep a Mummy (2018) - Aa-kun, Tazuki Kamiya (child)Tokyo Ghoul:re (2018) - Hairu IheiAsobi Asobase (2018) - Hanako's motherKemurikusa (2019) - RyokuMagical Girl Spec-Ops Asuka (2019) - Kurumi MugenKemono Michi: Rise Up (2019) - ShigureTower of God (2020) - Aanak JahadAssault Lily Bouquet (2020) - Araya EndōAkebi's Sailor Uniform (2022) - Kei TanigawaCap Kakumei Bottleman DX (2022) - Kaori HakaseBirdie Wing: Golf Girls' Story (2022) - Lily LipmanFuuto PI (2022) - TokimeIs It Wrong to Try to Pick Up Girls in a Dungeon? IV (2023) - MaryūThe Iceblade Sorcerer Shall Rule the World (2023) - Ariane OlgrenSoaring Sky! Pretty Cure (2023) - Sora Harewataru/Cure Sky

Anime filmsPrincess Principal: Crown Handler (2021) - Princess

Original video animationFate/Grand Carnival (2021) - Ritsuka Fujimaru

Original net animationHigh-Rise Invasion (2021) - Kuon Shinzaki

GamesShanago Collection - Legacy OutbackAikatsu! My No.1 Stage! - Miyabi FujiwaraEARTH WARS.hack//New WorldKoku No Ishtaria - Ara, Noel, Allan, HeliosTenka Hyakken - Fudou YukimitsuAsh Arms - Spitfire Mk. I, SU-85Grimms Notes - Princess AuroraStreet Fighter V - Akira KazamaArknights - HeidiAzur Lane - SMS YorckGate of Nightmares - Nicole, OliviaDa Capo 5 - Akari ShirakawaCrymachina'' - Heim

References

External links
Official agency profile 

Living people
Actresses from Tokyo
Japanese video game actresses
Japanese voice actresses
21st-century Japanese actresses
Year of birth missing (living people)